Charles Herbert Best  (February 27, 1899 – March 31, 1978) was an American-Canadian medical scientist and one of the co-discoverers of insulin.

Biography
Born in West Pembroke, Maine on February 27, 1899 to Luella Fisher and Herbert Huestis Best, Canadian born physician from Nova Scotia. Best grew up in Pembroke before going to Toronto, Ontario to study medicine in 1915.

Best married Margaret Hooper Mahon in Toronto in 1924 and they had two sons. One son, Henry Best was a well-regarded historian who later became president of Laurentian University in Sudbury, Ontario. Best's other son was Charles Alexander Best, a Canadian politician and geneticist. Best is the grandfather of Susan MacTavish Best.

His father, Herbert Best, was a doctor in a small Maine town with a limited economy based mostly on sardine-packing. His mother, Lulu Newcomb, later Lulu Best, who sang soprano, accompanying herself on organ and piano, was in demand as a performer at funerals and weddings. By the time Charles had reached college age and was choosing between such schools as McGill University and the University of Toronto, family connections persuaded him to pursue his studies in Toronto. Family illness had guided Best's research interests—his Aunt Anna dying of diabetes had profound effects on him. It was for this reason, and the fact that his father was a physician, that he chose to study at University of Toronto and train to become a doctor. His university studies were interrupted following his first year by the onset of the First World War. He served as an infantry soldier, reaching the rank of acting Sergeant Major. Following his service, he eventually returned to university in Toronto, but was falling behind in his classes. He later claimed that the greatest moment of his life occurred when he met his future wife, Margaret Mahon (1900-1988) following his return.

Best died on March 31, 1978 in Toronto. He is interred in Mount Pleasant Cemetery, Toronto, not far from Sir Frederick Banting.

Co-discovery of insulin
 
Best moved in 1915 to Toronto, Ontario, where he started studying towards a bachelor of arts degree at University College, University of Toronto. In 1918, he enlisted in the Canadian Army serving with the 2nd Canadian Tank Battalion. After the war, he completed his degree in physiology and biochemistry.

As a 22-year-old medical student at the University of Toronto he worked as an assistant to the surgeon Dr. Frederick Banting and contributed to the discovery of the pancreatic hormone insulin, which led to an effective treatment for diabetes. In the spring of 1921, Banting travelled to Toronto to visit J.J.R. Macleod, professor of physiology at the University of Toronto, and asked Macleod if he could use his laboratory to isolate pancreatic extracts from dogs. Macleod was initially sceptical, but eventually agreed before leaving on holiday for the summer. Before leaving for Scotland he supplied Banting with ten dogs for experiment and two medical students, Charles Best and Edward Clark Noble, as lab assistants.

It was reported that Best and Noble flipped a coin to see who would assist Banting during the first period of four weeks. According to Best, however, this was the product of a journalist’s imagination, or "newspaper fiction".

MacLeod was overseeing the work of Banting, who had no experience of physiology, and his assistant Best. In December 1921, when Banting and Best were having difficulties in refining the pancreatic extract and monitoring glucose levels, MacLeod assigned the biochemist James Collip to the team. In January 1922, while Collip was working on insulin purification, Best and Banting administered prematurely their pancreatic extracts to 14-year-old Leonard Thompson, who suffered a severe allergic reaction. Eventually, Collip succeeded in preparing insulin in a more pure, usable form. Banting, Best and Collip shared the patent for insulin, which they sold to the University of Toronto for one dollar.

In 1923, the Nobel Prize Committee honoured Banting and J. J. R. Macleod with the Nobel Prize in Medicine for the discovery of insulin, ignoring Best and Collip. Banting chose to share half of the prize money with Best. The key contribution by Collip was recognised in the Nobel speech of MacLeod, who also gave one-half of his prize money to Collip. In 1972 the Nobel Foundation officially conceded that omitting Best was a mistake. In fact, Best was not considered because he was never nominated. Nomination for a Nobel Prize can only be made by certain individuals, including former recipients of the Prize, and his central role along with Banting was simply not known to those who had the ability to make nominations. Best was subsequently nominated for the 1950 Nobel Prize in physiology based on his work on choline and heparin.

Professor of physiology
Best succeeded Macleod as professor of physiology at University of Toronto in 1929. During World War II he was influential in establishing a Canadian program for securing and using dried human blood serum. In his later years, he was an adviser to the Medical Research Committee of the United Nations World Health Organization.

Awards and honours

Best was elected a foreign member of the Royal Netherlands Academy of Arts and Sciences in 1946. He was elected a foreign honorary member of the American Academy of Arts and Sciences in 1948. He was elected to both the American Philosophical Society and the United States National Academy of Sciences in 1950. In 1967 he was made a Companion of the Order of Canada in recognition for "his contribution to medicine, particularly as co-discoverer of insulin." He was a commander of the Civil Division of the Order of the British Empire and was made a member of Order of the Companions of Honour in 1971 "for services to Medical Research". He was a fellow of the Royal Society of London, the Royal Society of Canada, and was the first Canadian to be elected into the Pontifical Academy of Sciences.

As a recipient of the Order of Canada, he was awarded the Canadian version of the Queen Elizabeth II Silver Jubilee Medal in 1977.

In 1994 he was inducted into the Canadian Medical Hall of Fame. In 2004, he was inducted into the National Inventors Hall of Fame.

Dr. Charles Best Secondary School in Coquitlam, British Columbia, Dr. Charles Best Public School in Burlington, Ontario, and Charles H. Best Middle School in Toronto, Ontario, are named in his honour. His birthplace in Maine is listed on the United States National Register of Historic Places.

Honorary degrees
Dr. Charles Best received 18 honorary degrees from universities around the world including

University of Chicago (D.Sc) in 1941
Université Sorbonne de Paris
University of Cambridge
University of Oxford
University of Amsterdam 8 January 1947
University of Louvain
University of Liège
University of Chile
University of Uruguay
University of San Marcos
University of Melbourne (LL.D) in 1952
University of Edinburgh (LL.D) in 1959
Northwestern University (D.Sc) in 1959
Aristotelian University of Thessaloniki
Free University of Berlin
Hebrew University of Jerusalem in 1972
University of Zagreb
University of Toronto (LL.D) in 1970.

See also 
 Nicolae Paulescu

References

Further reading
 
 John Waller (2002) Fabulous Science: fact and fiction in the history of scientific discovery, Oxford. See Chapter 11: "Painting yourself into a corner; Charles Best and the discovery of insulin", page 223.

External links
 

 CBC Digital Archives. Chasing a Cure for Diabetes. Accessed 16 June 2008.
Dr. Charles Best Secondary School. Accessed 16 June 2008.
Ontario Plaques, The Discovery of Insulin. Accessed 16 June 2008.
 
 University of Toronto. Banting and Best Department of Medical Research Charles Herbert Best. Accessed 16 June 2008.
"Rewriting Medical History: Charles Best and the Banting and Best Myth by Michael BLiss". Accessed 23 July 2011.
Charles Best Papers , Thomas Fisher Rare Book Library.
Charles H. Best Foundation archival papers held at the University of Toronto Archives and Records Management Services

1899 births
1978 deaths
Canadian medical researchers
Companions of the Order of Canada
Canadian Commanders of the Order of the British Empire
Canadian diabetologists
Fellows of the American Academy of Arts and Sciences
Canadian Fellows of the Royal Society
Fellows of the Royal Society of Canada
Foreign associates of the National Academy of Sciences
Members of the Order of the Companions of Honour
Members of the Royal Netherlands Academy of Arts and Sciences
University of Toronto alumni
Academic staff of the University of Toronto
People from Pembroke, Maine
Scientists from Maine
American emigrants to Canada
20th-century Canadian inventors
Members of the Royal Swedish Academy of Sciences
Members of the American Philosophical Society